Mohamed Ragab (born 19 June 1990), is an Egyptian footballer who plays for Egyptian Premier League side El Entag El Harby as a forward.

References
2 . http://www.efa.com.eg/PlayerProfile?id=131713&&competitionId=214 . Egyptian Football Association 

1990 births
Living people
Place of birth missing (living people)
Egyptian footballers
Association football forwards
Petrojet SC players
El Entag El Harby SC players
Egyptian Premier League players